RuvB-like 2 (E. coli), also known as RUVBL2, is a human gene coding for a protein belonging to the AAA+ family of proteins.

Function 

This gene encodes the second human homologue of the bacterial RuvB gene. Bacterial RuvB protein is a DNA helicase essential for homologous recombination and DNA double-strand break repair. However, the evidence for whether RUVBL2 has DNA helicase activity is contradictory. This gene is physically linked to the CGB/LHB gene cluster on chromosome 19q13.3, and is very close (55 nt) to the LHB gene, in the opposite orientation.

Interactions 

RUVBL2 has been shown to interact with RuvB-like 1 and Activating transcription factor 2.

References

Further reading